Lakeview is a census-designated place (CDP) in Grant County, Washington, United States. The population was 915 at the 2010 census, up from 797 at the 2000 census. The community is referred to as Lakeview Park on topographic maps and by locals.

Geography
Lakeview is located in northern Grant County at  (47.372937, -119.499004), along the southern border of the city of Soap Lake. Washington State Route 28 passes through the southeast corner of the CDP, leading east  to Odessa and southwest  to Ephrata.

Demographics
As of the census of 2000, there were 797 people, 336 households, and 233 families residing in the CDP. The population density was 700.1 people per square mile (269.9/km2). There were 372 housing units at an average density of 326.8/sq mi (126.0/km2). The racial makeup of the CDP was 89.46% White, 1.00% African American, 2.13% Native American, 0.25% Asian, 4.14% from other races, and 3.01% from two or more races. Hispanic or Latino of any race were 8.41% of the population.

There were 336 households, out of which 22.6% had children under the age of 18 living with them, 56.8% were married couples living together, 9.5% had a female householder with no husband present, and 30.4% were non-families. 26.2% of all households were made up of individuals, and 14.6% had someone living alone who was 65 years of age or older. The average household size was 2.37 and the average family size was 2.79.

In the CDP, the population was spread out, with 24.0% under the age of 18, 5.0% from 18 to 24, 18.9% from 25 to 44, 27.9% from 45 to 64, and 24.2% who were 65 years of age or older. The median age was 48 years. For every 100 females, there were 90.2 males. For every 100 females age 18 and over, there were 94.2 males.

The median income for a household in the CDP was $30,588, and the median income for a family was $35,313. Males had a median income of $31,607 versus $21,563 for females. The per capita income for the CDP was $17,448. About 13.4% of families and 18.6% of the population were below the poverty line, including 49.6% of those under age 18 and 2.6% of those age 65 or over.

References

Census-designated places in Grant County, Washington
Census-designated places in Washington (state)